Nighthawks at the Diner is the third studio album by singer and songwriter Tom Waits, released on October 21, 1975 on Asylum Records. It was recorded over four sessions in July in the Los Angeles Record Plant studio in front of a small invited audience set up to recreate the atmosphere of a jazz club. The album peaked at 164 on the Billboard 200, the highest place Waits had held at the time, and is currently certified silver by the BPI. It has received critical acclaim for its successful mood-setting, capturing of the jazz-club atmosphere and characterization.

Background
The title was inspired by Edward Hopper's 1942 painting Nighthawks. The album's working title had been "Nighthawk Postcards from Easy Street," but was shortened to Nighthawks at the Diner, which is the opening line to "Eggs and Sausage (In a Cadillac with Susan Michelson)". The cover, designed by Cal Schenkel, is also inspired by the painting.

Recording
The album was recorded at Record Plant Los Angeles on July 30 and 31, 1975. Waits opens the album by calling the venue Raphael's Silver Cloud Lounge. Bones Howe, the album's producer, on the recording of the album:

Howe was mostly responsible for organizing the band for the "live show", and creating the right atmosphere for the record.

Dewana was an old-time burlesque queen whom Tom had met on one of his jaunts to the Hollywood underworld. Jim Hughart, who played upright bass on the recordings recalled the experience of preparing for and recording the album:

"Preparing for this thing, we had to memorize all this stuff, 'cause Waits had nothing on paper. So ultimately, we spent four or five days in a rehearsal studio going over this stuff. And that was drudgery. But when we did actually get it all prepared and go and record, that was the fastest two days of recording I've ever spent in my life. It was so fun. Some of the tunes were not what you'd call jazz tunes, but for the most part that was like a jazz record. This was a jazz band. Bill Goodwin was a drummer who was associated with Phil Woods for years. Pete Christlieb is one of the best jazz tenor players who ever lived. And my old friend, Mike Melvoin, played piano. There's a good reason why it was accepted as a jazz record."

During the track "Nighthawk Postcards (From Easy Street)", Waits ad-libs lines from "That's Life", a hit for Frank Sinatra.

Reception

Nighthawks at the Diner charted on the Billboard 200, where it peaked at 164. This was the highest position he had ever held at the time. His next album, Small Change, would be his highest charting with Asylum Records, with whom he would eventually part company in 1981. Nighthawks is currently certified Silver by the BPI.

The album has been generally well received by critics, and is considered by some to be the best album of his early career. It is included in the book 1001 Albums You Must Hear Before You Die. In its accompanying chapter in the book, Peter Watts stated that "although it could be dismissed as an entertaining conceit, the fake nightclub atmosphere of Nighthawks... possibly captures the appeal of early Waits even better than the two impressive albums that preceded it." AllMusic reviewer Mark Deming wrote: "You could call it overdone, but then, this kind of material made its impact through an accumulation of miscellaneous detail, and who's to say how much is too much?". He positively noted Waits' addition of comedy and acting into the set. On November 18, 2010, Rhapsody named it the album of the day, with staff writer Nate Cavalieri noting that "Waits' meticulous persona is remarkable."

Track listing

Personnel
Tom Waits – vocals, piano, guitar
 Pete Christlieb – tenor saxophone
 Bill Goodwin – drums
 Jim Hughart – upright bass
 Mike Melvoin – piano, electric piano, guitar

Charts

Certifications

Notes

References

External links

Nighthawks at the Diner (Adobe Flash) at Radio3Net (streamed copy where licensed)

1975 albums
Tom Waits albums
Asylum Records albums
Albums produced by Bones Howe